Ludick may refer to:

Adriaan Ludick (born 1998), Namibian rugby union player
Albert Ludick (born 1939), South African boxer
Eddie Ludick (born 1999), South African rugby union player
Lodewijck van Ludick (1629–1724), landscape painter from the Northern Netherlands
Ruan Ludick (born 1994), Namibian rugby union player
Stefan Ludick (born 1981), Namibian musician, television personality, and actor from Windhoek City
Willem Ludick (born 1997), South African cricketer who has played domestic cricket in New Zealand
Willie Ludick (1941–2003), South African boxer